Florin Iacob (born 16 August 1993) is a Romanian professional footballer who plays as a goalkeeper for Liga I side UTA Arad.

International career
Iacob was called up for the first time to the Romania senior squad for the World Cup qualifiers against North Macedonia and Germany in March 2021.

Honours
Unirea Tărlungeni
Liga III: 2012–13

Concordia Chiajna
Cupa Ligii runner-up: 2015–16

UTA Arad
Liga II: 2019–20

External links

References

1993 births
Living people
Sportspeople from Brașov
Romanian footballers
Association football goalkeepers
Liga I players
Liga II players
FC Brașov (1936) players
CS Concordia Chiajna players
ASA 2013 Târgu Mureș players
CS Sportul Snagov players
FC Metaloglobus București players
FC UTA Arad players